Episkopiko is a small village in northwest Greece near the city of Ioannina.

History
The village, known as Bartzi, was first referred by the English historian William Martin Leake, in 1805.

References

 Travels in Northern Greece-William Martin Leake

External links 
 Episkopiko website

Populated places in Ioannina (regional unit)